The Cathedral of Our Lady of the Immaculate Conception  also called Santarém Cathedral formerly known as Church of Our Lady of the Immaculate Conception, is located in the historic centre of Santarém, more precisely in the parish of São Salvador in Portugal.

History 
This Jesuit church, dating from the seventeenth century, was erected on the site of the royal palace of the Alcazaba Nova, abandoned since the time of King John II. Later, with the expulsion of the Jesuits from Portugal by order of the Marquis of Pombal, the building became host to the Patriarchal Seminary after being donated by D. Maria I for this purpose, and it remained in that use until the twentieth century.

When the Diocese of Santarém was created, in 1975, the church was elevated to the status of cathedral.

The Diocesan Museum of Santarém is located in the Episcopal Palace, part of the Cathedral complex.

See also
 List of Jesuit sites
 Roman Catholicism in Portugal
 Our Lady of the Immaculate Conception

References

External links 

Santarem
Roman Catholic churches completed in 1711
Churches in Santarém District
National monuments in Santarém District
18th-century Roman Catholic church buildings in Portugal